Takeshi Inoue may refer to:

, Japanese footballer
, Japanese mixed martial artist
Takeshi Inoue, better known as Takeshi Rikio (born 1972), Japanese professional wrestler